is the forty-second single of  Japanese solo artist Gackt, released on October 10, 2012. It is the theme song for the drama Sengoku Basara. The title song was simultaneously released in Europe by Gan-Shin as a digital download on Amazon and other sites, but is not available on iTunes.

Track listings and formats

Notes

Charts

Oricon

Billboard Japan

References

2012 singles
Gackt songs
Japanese television drama theme songs
Songs written by Gackt
2012 songs
Avex Trax singles